Runcinia grammica (sometimes also referred to as Runcinia lateralis) is a species of spiders of the genus Runcinia, with a distribution of "Europa, Near East to Iran, Russia, Central Asia, China, Japan. Introduced to St. Helena, South Africa."

The species generally lives in peat bogs, fens, and meadows, although it has also been known to inhabit urban areas They usually mature to adulthood in the summer. They have short, broad bodies, which are covered in hair and spines. They have clear muscular corrugation on their sides, and, on small raised bumps on their heads, eight small eyes. Males are usually 2.5–3.5mm in length, females 4-6mm. They are predators, and eat various species of insects.

Unlike many spiders, they do not spin a web of any kind.  Instead, they prowl on the ground, as well as climbing plants and flowers, to find their prey. They can move forwards, backwards, and sideways.

Runcina grammica has reportedly been sighted in various areas of Southeastern Spain and Southwestern Portugal. They are also known to inhabit Armenia, Georgia, Azerbaijan, Caucasus, Italy, India, South Africa, St. Helena, Turkey, France, and in the Carpathian Basin. They are among the most common species of spiders in Portugal. They are one of the many species preserved at the Mountain Zebra National Park, in South Africa.

References

Thomisidae
Spiders described in 1837
Spiders of Europe
Spiders of Asia